Lies is a small village on Terschelling in the province of Friesland, the Netherlands. It had a population of around 145 in January 2017.

Sources
Municipality guide Terschelling 2005-2006

References

Populated places in Friesland
Terschelling